Western Australia atlas of mineral deposits and petroleum fields is a multiple-edition summary of mining and petroleum activity in Western Australia in the twenty-first century.

It was published in earlier forms by the earlier Department of Mines, later the Department of Industry and Resources, and most recently the Department of Mines and Petroleum, and the Geological Survey of Western Australia

The editions of the map, and the specifying the names of the mine and oilfield operators provide an indicative profile of the mineral and petroleum activity in a state that had significant investment fluctuations in the 2000s, and 2010s, with a large amount of investment and government budgetary estimations based on the perceived extended boom of the industries.

Earlier forms
Prior to the Atlas series, there were dated maps without text or indexes.

 1906  The 1906 map created by Maitland Brown was a major accomplishment to tie in the range of mineral fields and administrative issues regarding mining in the state, when technology had not conquered distances and logistic issues in updating information about discoveries or mines.
 1983

Post 1990
Most of the post 1990 editions were considered a periodical (1990-2015) in some library systems.

Earlier editions were attributed to the Geological Survey of WA, however later editions include the main authors, compilers and editors:

 1995

Compilers identified
 1999
 2001
 2005
 2007
 2013
 2015

Baseline geology
Each edition refers to the specified geological origins of the information (from the 2007 edition):

Online
Most of the reports are now available online as PDF files.

Notes

Mining in Western Australia
Petroleum industry in Western Australia